Bondia nigella is a moth in the family Carposinidae. It was described by Newman in 1856. It is found in Australia, where it has been recorded from the eastern part of the country and Tasmania.

References

Natural History Museum Lepidoptera generic names catalog

Carposinidae
Moths described in 1856